Amatrice earthquake may refer to:
1639 Amatrice earthquake
August 2016 Central Italy earthquake
October 2016 Central Italy earthquakes